Raymond Leonard Hodge is a former New Zealand diver, who represented his country at the 1958 British Empire and Commonwealth Games in Cardiff, Wales.

Representing Canterbury, Hodge was the New Zealand national diving champion every year from 1958 to 1962, and was the National Men's Springboard Diving Champion in 1963.

At the 1958 British Empire and Commonwealth Games, Hodge competed in the men's 3-metre springboard event, finishing in sixth place.

References

Living people
Sportspeople from Christchurch
New Zealand male divers
Commonwealth Games competitors for New Zealand
Divers at the 1958 British Empire and Commonwealth Games
Year of birth missing (living people)